Lake Eight is a lake in Kandiyohi County, in the U.S. state of Minnesota.

Lake Eight was named from the fact it is in section 8 on county maps.

See also
List of lakes in Minnesota

References

Lakes of Minnesota
Lakes of Kandiyohi County, Minnesota